The 2016 Milwaukee mayoral election was held on Tuesday, April 5, 2016, to elect the mayor for Milwaukee.  Incumbent mayor Tom Barrett was elected to a fourth term, defeating Bob Donovan.

Municipal elections in Wisconsin are non-partisan.  The non-partisan primary was held on Tuesday, February 16, 2016, to narrow the field of candidates to two.

Primary election

Candidates
 Tom Barrett, incumbent
 Bob Donovan, District 8 Alderman
 Joe Davis, District 2 Alderman
 James Methu, journalist

Results

General election

Candidates
 Tom Barrett, incumbent
 Bob Donovan, District 8 Alderman

Endorsements

Results

References

2016 Wisconsin elections
Milwaukee
2016
Government of Milwaukee